This was the first edition of the tournament as an ATP Challenger Tour event.

Andrew Harris and John-Patrick Smith won the title after defeating Toshihide Matsui and Kaito Uesugi 6–3, 4–6, [10–8] in the final.

Seeds

Draw

References

External links
 Main draw

Matsuyama Challenger - Doubles